Raymond Crapet (11 November 1927 – 1 February 2002) was a French sprinter. He competed in the men's 400 metres at the 1948 Summer Olympics.

References

1927 births
2002 deaths
Athletes (track and field) at the 1948 Summer Olympics
French male sprinters
Olympic athletes of France
Place of birth missing